Flint is a surname. Notable people with the surname include:

 Austin Flint (1812–1886), American physician
 Austin Flint (1836–1915, American physician
 Bob Flint (born 1941), American/Hawaiian ceramicist
 Bruiser Flint (born 1968), American basketball coach
 Caroline Flint (born 1961), British Member of Parliament for the Don Valley
 Charles Ranlett Flint (1850–1934), American merchant and banker
 Derrick Flint (1924–2018), English cricketer
 Douglas Flint (born 1955), British banking businessman currently the Group Chairman of HSBC Holdings
 Edwin Flint (1814-1891), American politician
 Eric Flint (1947–2022), American science fiction and fantasy author and editor
 F. S. Flint (1885-1960), English poet
 George Flint (American football) (born 1939), American football player
 George Washington Flint (1844–1921), American educator and college president 
Henry Flynt (born 1940), American avantgarde musician
 James Flint (disambiguation), multiple people
 Jeremy Flint (1928–1989), English contract bridge player
 Jon Flint (Jonathan A. Flint), American venture capitalist and entrepreneur
 Josh Flint (born 2000), English footballer
 Joshua Barker Flint (1801–1864), American surgeon and professor of medicine
 Judson Flint (born 1957), American football player
 Katja Flint (born 1960), German actress
 Keith Flint (1969–2019), member of the British band The Prodigy
 Kenneth C. Flint, American fantasy novelist
 Larry Flynt (1942–2021), American magazine publisher (commonly misspelled "Flint")
 Paul Flint, (born 1987), British Tattoo Artist and skateboarder 
 Richard Foster Flint (1902–1976), American geologist
 Robert Flint (1838–1910), Scottish theologian and philosopher
 Rockwell  J. Flint (1842-1933), American politician
 Roland Flint (1934-2001), American poet
 Valerie Flint (1936-2009), British historian
 Waldo Flint (1820-1900), American politician
 William Russell Flint (1880–1969), Scottish artist

Fictional characters:
 Derek Flint, the title character of Our Man Flint (1966) and In Like Flint (1967), a "hipster spy" played by James Coburn
 Marcus Flint, character in the Harry Potter series

English-language surnames